The following elections occurred in the year 1978.

Africa
 1978 Cameroonian parliamentary election
 1978 Comorian legislative election
 1978 Comorian presidential election
 1978 Egyptian protection of national unity and social peace referendum
 1978 Ghanaian governmental referendum
 1978 Malawian general election
 1978 Rwandan constitutional referendum
 1978 Rwandan presidential election
 1978 Senegalese general election
 1978 Sierra Leonean constitutional referendum
 1978 South West African legislative election
 1978 Sudanese parliamentary election
 1978 Swazi general election
 1978 Upper Voltan parliamentary election
 1978 Upper Voltan presidential election
 1978 Zambian general election

Asia
 1978 Malaysian general election
 1978 Maldivian presidential election
 1978 Philippine parliamentary election
 1978 Philippine parliamentary sectoral election
 1978 Taiwan presidential election

Australia
 1978 New South Wales state election

Europe
 1978 Albanian parliamentary election
 1978 Andorran political reform referendum
 1978 Austrian nuclear power referendum
 1978 Belgian general election
 Cardinal electors in Papal conclaves, August and October 1978
 1978 Danish electoral age referendum
 1978 Icelandic parliamentary election
 1978 Italian referendums
 October 1978 Papal conclave
 August 1978 Papal conclave
 1978 Shetland referendum
 Spanish constitutional referendum
 1978 Swiss referendums
 Vatican: two Papal conclaves: 
 August 1978 Papal conclave
 October 1978 Papal conclave

France
 1978 French legislative election

Germany
 :de:Bürgerschaftswahl in Hamburg 1978 (Hamburg) 
 :de:Landtagswahl in Niedersachsen 1978 (Lower Saxony) 
 :de:Landtagswahl in Hessen 1978 (Hesse)
 :de:Landtagswahl in Bayern 1978 (Bavaria)

North America
 Greenlandic alcohol referendum
 1978 Guatemalan general election
 1978 Panamanian parliamentary election
 1978 Panamanian presidential election
 1978 Salvadoran legislative election

Canada
 1978 Brantford municipal election
 1978 New Brunswick general election
 1978 Ontario municipal elections
 1978 Ottawa municipal election
 1978 Prince Edward Island general election
 1978 Saskatchewan general election
 1978 Toronto municipal election
 1978 Yukon general election

United States
 1978 United States Senate elections
 1978 United States House of Representatives elections
 1978 United States gubernatorial elections

United States mayoral
 1978 Cleveland mayoral recall election
 1978 Washington, D.C. mayoral election

United States gubernatorial
 1978 Arkansas gubernatorial election
 1978 California gubernatorial election
 1978 Maine gubernatorial election
 1978 Minnesota gubernatorial election
 1978 Oregon gubernatorial election
 1978 South Carolina gubernatorial election
 1978 Texas gubernatorial election
 1978 United States gubernatorial elections

Arkansas
 1978 Arkansas gubernatorial election

California
 1978 California gubernatorial election
 United States House of Representatives elections in California, 1978
 1978 California Proposition 7
 1978 California Proposition 8
 1978 California Proposition 13

Florida
 1978 Florida state elections

Illinois
 United States Senate election in Illinois, 1978

Maine
 1978 Maine gubernatorial election
 United States Senate election in Maine, 1978

Minnesota
 1978 Minnesota gubernatorial election

Nebraska
 United States Senate election in Nebraska, 1978

Ohio
 1978 Cleveland recall election

Oregon
 1978 Oregon gubernatorial election

South Carolina
 1978 South Carolina gubernatorial election
 1978 United States House of Representatives elections in South Carolina

Texas
 1978 Texas gubernatorial election

United States House of Representatives
 1978 United States House of Representatives elections
 United States House of Representatives elections in South Carolina, 1978
 United States House of Representatives elections in California, 1978

United States Senate
 1978 United States Senate elections
 United States Senate election in Georgia, 1978
 United States Senate election in Illinois, 1978
 United States Senate election in Maine, 1978
 United States Senate election in Massachusetts, 1978
 United States Senate election in Mississippi, 1978
 United States Senate election in Nebraska, 1978
 United States Senate election in North Carolina, 1978
 United States Senate election in South Carolina, 1978

Washington, D.C.
 1978 Washington, D.C. mayoral election

Oceania
 1978 American Samoan referendum
 1978 Cook Islands general election
 1978 New Zealand general election
 1978 Trust Territory of the Pacific Islands constitutional referendum
 1978 Rangitikei by-election

Australia
 1978 New South Wales state election

South America
 1978 Chilean national consultation
 1978 Ecuadorian constitutional referendum
 1978 Guyanese constitutional referendum
 1978 Peruvian Constituent Assembly election
 1978 Venezuelan presidential election

See also

 
1978
Elections